Mather Lodge is a historic park facility at Petit Jean State Park in Conway County, Arkansas.  It is the centerpiece of the park's developed infrastructure, providing lodging, a meeting and function space, and a restaurant for park visitors.  The lodge was built in 1935 by a crew of the Civilian Conservation Corps, and is one of the fine examples of the CCC architecture of Petit Jean State Park.  It is built in the Rustic style for which the CCC became well known.

The lodge was listed on the National Register of Historic Places in 1992.

See also
National Register of Historic Places listings in Conway County, Arkansas

References

National Register of Historic Places in Conway County, Arkansas
Buildings and structures completed in 1935
Conway County, Arkansas
Civilian Conservation Corps in Arkansas
Rustic architecture in Arkansas